A list of films produced in Italy in 1938 (see 1938 in film):

See also
List of Italian films of 1937
List of Italian films of 1939

References

External links
Italian films of 1938 at the Internet Movie Database

Italian
1938
Films